Eastern Morocco Zenati dialects are a group of Berber dialects spoken in Morocco from Jerada Province to Berkane Province.

They belong to the Zenati dialectal group and are closely related to the main Riffian dialects, as well as to the At Snous dialect, spoken beside the border in Algeria.

Eastern Morocco Zenati is spoken among the Berber tribes of Beni Bouzegou, Beni Ya'la, Zkara, Bekhata, Haddiyin, Meharez, At Iznasen, and Rwaba'. 

Formerly, these dialects were also spoken in the area between Debdou and Taourirt (to the west of their current speaking area) by the tribes of Beni Koulal, Oulad Mahdi and Beni Chebel; these tribes are currently mainly Arabic-speakers.

References 

Zenati languages
Languages of Morocco
Jerada Province